Mohammed Abdulhakeem Al-Fatil (born 4 January 1992) is a Saudi Arabian professional footballer who plays as a centre-back for Al-Nassr and the Saudi Arabia national team.

Career
Al Fatil started his career at Al-Taraji in his hometown of Qatif. On 31 May 2009, Al Fatil signed for Al-Ahli and joined their youth team. He made his first-team debut on 11 January 2012 in the 4–0 away win against Najran in the 16th round of the Pro League. Al Fatil signed his first professional contract with the club alongside 27 other players on 25 June 2012. On 11 January 2015, Al Fatil signed a new three-year deal with Al-Ahli. On 3 May 2018, Al Fatil renewed his contract with Al-Ahli for another three years. On 4 August 2021, Al Fatil joined Al-Nassr.

Career statistics

Club

International
Statistics accurate as of match played 21 January 2019.

International goals
Scores and results list Saudi Arabia's goal tally first.

Honours

Club
Al-Ahli
Saudi Professional League: 2015–16
King Cup: 2012, 2016
Saudi Crown Prince Cup: 2014–15
Saudi Super Cup: 2016

References

External links
 

1992 births
People from Qatif
Al-Taraji Club players
Al-Ahli Saudi FC players
Al Nassr FC players
Saudi Arabian footballers
Living people
Footballers at the 2014 Asian Games
2019 AFC Asian Cup players
Saudi Arabia international footballers
Saudi Arabia youth international footballers
Saudi Professional League players
Association football defenders
Asian Games competitors for Saudi Arabia
Saudi Arabian Shia Muslims
21st-century Saudi Arabian people